The National Bio-science Award for Career Development or N-BIOS Prize is an Indian science award for recognizing excellence and promoting research in bio-sciences disciplines. It was instituted in 1999 by the Department of Biotechnology of the Government of India and is for encouraging Indian bio-scientists of less than 45 years of age. The award is given annually for unique contributions made towards the development of state of art in basic and applied areas of biological sciences through demonstrated activity in the form of publication in reputed journals and or patents. The award recognizes research and development work carried out in India during the last 5 years of the career. The award is one of the highest Indian biology awards, next to the Shanti Swarup Bhatnagar Prize given by the Council of Scientific and Industrial Research of India.

N-BIOS Award recipients 
List of awardees

Recipients (1999–2009)

Recipients (2009–2019)

See also

 List of biology awards

References

External links 
 

2016    

Indian awards
Career awards
Civil awards and decorations of India
Indian science and technology awards
Awards established in 1999
1999 establishments in India